Place of Bones is an upcoming western film directed by Audrey Cummings and starring Heather Graham and Tom Hopper. The film is produced by Gold Rush Entertainment and Latigo Films. The film is set to be released on digital streaming service Netflix.

Synopsis
In 1876, a bank robbery gone wrong leaves an outlaw Bear John (Hopper) determinedly looking for a traitor within his gang who has made off with his stolen money. The traitor Calhoun (Nemec) meanwhile finds himself at a remote ranch where Pandora (Graham) and her daughter live. Pandora is forced to defend what is hers as Bear and his gang of bandits draw closer to delivering their brutal revenge.

Cast
 Heather Graham as Pandora 
 Tom Hopper as Bear John 
 Donald Cerrone
 Coric Nemec as Calhoun
 Brielle Robillard as Hester
 David Lipper as Ed Singletary

Production
In January 2023 it was announced that Eric Gozlan, David Lipper were producers for the film for Goldrush Entertainment and Robert A. Daly Jnr for Latigo Films. Audrey Cummings was to direct from a Robert Taylor script with Hopper and Graham in lead roles.

Principal photography wrapped on the production in Los Angeles in February 2023.

Broadcast
In February 2023 Collider reported that the film would be available on the online streaming service Netflix.

References

External links

Upcoming films
2020s American films
2020s English-language films
American Western (genre) films
Films shot in California